Cellypha is a genus of fungi in the family Tricholomataceae. The widespread genus contains 10 species.

See also

List of Tricholomataceae genera

References

Tricholomataceae
Agaricales genera